CGCN Group is an issue advocacy and lobbying firm in Washington, D.C. The all-Republican firm has ties to GOP leadership and the party's conservative wing. Its clients include banks, finance, and oil companies, in addition to companies such as Microsoft, MasterCard, and Boeing. The firm was formerly known as Clark Geduldig Cranford & Nielsen.

History
CGCN Group originated from the lobbying firm created by Steve Clark in 2000. Sam Geduldig and Gary Lytle joined Clark in 2007, and the firm became known as Clark Lytle & Geduldig.

The firm worked with financial services companies during the financial reform debate from 2009 to 2010, involving laws like the Dodd–Frank Wall Street Reform and Consumer Protection Act and the Consumer Financial Protection Bureau. At the time, CGCN had more financial services clients in Washington, D.C., than other firms during the Troubled Asset Relief Program. In the wake of Republicans taking control of Congress in 2010, CGCN saw strong growth in its business and the firm doubled in size from 2015 to 2017. While closely tied to GOP leadership—its partners have worked with former House Speaker John Boehner and others—CGCN was among the first lobbying firms to court the conservative Freedom Caucus.

The firm was known as Clark Lytle Geduldig & Cranford and Clark Geduldig Cranford & Nielsen between 2011 and 2015, when the firm renamed itself CGCN Group. In 2015, CGCN's clients included oil companies, such as Hess, for whom they lobbied to end the ban of crude oil exports. CGCN was named a top lobbying firm by Bloomberg Government in 2015. A report by Bloomberg Government gave CGCN the highest mark for firms retaining clients over the long term. According to Bloomberg, CGCN retains 83 percent of its clients for at least three years, a higher percentage than other firms.

CGCN began working with foreign clients in 2016 when Saudi Arabia hired the firm to build relationships with U.S. congressional Republicans. The next year, CGCN signed Japan as its second foreign client. In 2017, CGCN lobbied for: SAP America on data security, privacy, cybersecurity, health IT, cloud computing and privacy shield implementation; Puerto Rico Department of Treasury; American Investment Council, a private equity trade group; power company NextEra Energy on energy policy and tax credits; and TransCanada Corp. on the Keystone XL pipeline. The firm's other clients include 21st Century Fox, Microsoft, MasterCard and Boeing. Also in 2017, CGCN announced a partnership with four Democratic firms with close ties to the Congressional Black and Congressional Hispanic caucuses to seek bipartisan victories, potentially in the areas of "jobs, transportation infrastructure, outside investment, energy, and economic development", according to a memo on the partnership.

In the few years leading up to 2017, CGCN Group quadrupled in size. Like other lobbying firms, CGCN Group posted a strong first year under the Trump administration. It made $8.4 million in revenue in 2017 (compared to $6.6 million in 2016), including $2.2 million in the fourth quarter (compared to $1.6 million the year before). CGCN terminated its relationship with Saudi Arabia in 2018. According to the Roll Call, CGCN is closely related to UBI (United by Interest), a bipartisan K Street (Washington, D.C.) group lobbying business interests on Capitol Hill.

Partners
CGCN Group has 11 partners as of March 2020: Steve Clark, Jay Cranford, Sam Geduldig, Mike Nielsen, John Stipicevic, Juliane Sullivan, Mike Catanzaro, Aaron Szabo, Matt Rhoades, Antonia Ferrier, and Scott Riplinger

Initial partners
Partner Steve Clark began the firm in 2000 in Ohio. Sam Geduldig joined in 2007, after previously working as senior advisor to U.S. Representative Roy Blunt and John Boehner's political director from 1997 to 2000. In 2011, Geduldig was named one of Washingtonian 40 Under 40, and he ranked No. 3 on K Street's top 10 lobbyists giving to the GOP in 2016. Clark and Geduldig are consistently named to The Hill'''s top lobbyists list. Geduldig first appeared on the list in 2008. Jay Cranford joined Clark Lytle & Geduldig in 2011. Cranford previously was a policy aide to Boehner and worked for the U.S. House's Natural Resources Subcommittee on Energy and Mineral Resources. Cranford joined CGCN to build its energy and tech business. Mike Nielsen joined CGCN in 2013. He previously worked an aide to GOP members of the Senate Banking Committee and with U.S. Senator Bob Bennett. Nielsen worked on the Gramm-Leach-Bliley Act and the Dodd-Frank financial overhaul.

Partners since 2014
Doug Schwartz became partner at CGCN in 2014. He was formerly chief of staff for the Senate Republican Conference and aide to U.S. Senator John Thune. John Stipicevic was a member of House Majority Leader Kevin McCarthy's office, where he liaisoned between GOP leadership and conservative members of Congress, before joining CGCN in 2015. Juliane Sullivan, a former staff director of the House Education and the Workforce Committee under John Kline and policy director for former House Majority Leader Tom DeLay, became partner in 2017. Patrick O'Connor, a former Washington reporter with Politico, Bloomberg News, and The Wall Street Journal'' who joined CGCN in 2016, launched the firm's strategic communications division. Ken Spain, who worked with Koch Industries and Private Equity Growth Capital Council, joined CGCN in 2016 to help bolster the strategic communications unit. Mike Freeman, former counsel on the U.S. House Natural Resources Committee and advisor to U.S. Senator Mike Lee, joined in 2017.

Michael Catanzaro was a partner from 2015 until 2017, when Trump selected him as an energy advisor for the president's National Economic Council. Catanzaro also worked on Trump's transition team following the 2016 election. Catanzaro resigned from the Trump administration in April 2018 to rejoin CGCN Group. Aaron Szabo, a lawyer who worked in both the Obama and Trump administrations, was named partner in 2018.

Matt Rhoades and Antonia Ferrier (former aide to Mitch McConnell) joined the firm in 2019. Scott Riplinger (former legislative director for Mike Crapo) joined CGCN in 2020.

References

External links 
 Official website 
 Sam Geduldig political campaign contributions: 2016 election cycle

Lobbying firms based in Washington, D.C.